José Luis Ablanedo Iglesias (born 22 August 1962) is a Spanish former footballer who played as a central defender.

Club career
Born in Mieres, Asturias, Ablanedo played the vast majority of his career with local Sporting de Gijón, making his senior debut whilst still a junior in a Copa del Rey match against amateurs CD Turón in November 1980. He spent several years with the reserves in the lower leagues, and played his first La Liga game with the main squad on 22 April 1984 in a 3–0 away loss against Real Betis.

Ablanedo was definitely promoted to the first team for the 1985–86 season, and contributed a career-best 43 matches and four goals as Sporting finished in fourth position the following campaign. He spent 1991–92 on loan to RCD Español also in the top flight, and retired with his main club in June 1994 at nearly 32 years of age.

Personal life
Ablanedo's younger brother, Juan Carlos, was also a footballer. A goalkeeper, he played solely for Sporting, and they were hence known as Ablanedo I and Ablanedo II.

References

External links

1962 births
Living people
Spanish footballers
Footballers from Mieres, Asturias
Association football defenders
La Liga players
Segunda División B players
Sporting de Gijón B players
Sporting de Gijón players
RCD Espanyol footballers